The 1674 Ambon earthquake occurred on February 17 between 19:30 and 20:00 local time in the Maluku Islands. It was the first detailed documentation of a tsunami in Indonesia and the largest ever recorded in the country. The exact fault which produced the earthquake has never been determined, but geologists postulate either a local fault, or a larger thrust fault offshore. The extreme tsunami was likely the result of a submarine landslide.

Overview
The tectonics of the North Maluku Islands is dominated by complex collision, subduction, and strike-slip elements. Intermediate to deep focus earthquakes with a focal depth of 60 km or greater are immediately ruled out as the source because no known historical events of the same kind have generated a large tsunami. The 1938 Banda Sea earthquake, an intermediate depth magnitude 8.5 event only caused a minor tsunami.

The Seram Trough is a zone of complex convergence between the Pacific, Australian, Sunda, and numerous micro tectonic plates. This megathrust fault is located north of Seram Island. While it has generated large tsunamigenic earthquakes in the past such as that in 1899 and 1629, the fault is situated too far from Ambon to have caused huge tsunami run-ups.

Since the tsunami from the earthquake had an extreme run-up height of at least , researchers have dismissed the possibility of faulting as a source of the tsunami. Instead, an earthquake-generated landslide appears to be the likely source of the tsunami. However, the source of the earthquake has never been confirmed, but two faults, the South Seram Thrust and an unnamed fault on the island were the likely culprit.

Documentation
In an account by Georg Eberhard Rumphius, a German botanist, the earthquake occurred on a Saturday evening, at 7:30 pm local time, when locals on the islands were celebrating the Chinese Lunar New Year. The bells of the nearby Victoria Castle on Ambon Island began to clang by themselves. The earthquake was so strong as to knock people off their balance. Seventy-five stone buildings reportedly collapsed, killing 79 Chinese, five Europeans people and injuring 35 others. Most of the injuries were fractured arms and legs. Among the casualties in the collapses were European settlers. Blue clay and sand also erupted from the ground. Many homes and roads on other parts of the island were cracked and severely damaged. Both Rumphius's wife and two daughters were killed during the earthquake after they were crushed by a falling wall. They were among the 31 Europeans who died in the earthquake and tsunami.

Right after the earthquake, a large tsunami reportedly swept through the coast of the island. Entire forests and plantations were uprooted and washed away. The tsunami was accompanied by a deafening noise. When it slammed into the coast, eyewitnesses described the flow as very dirty and foul smelling.

See also
List of tsunamis
List of earthquakes in Indonesia
List of historical earthquakes
1852 Banda Sea earthquake

References

Earthquakes in Indonesia
Tsunamis in Indonesia
Megatsunamis
1674 disasters
1674 in the Dutch Empire
Maluku Islands